Gauthildr Algautsdóttir (Swedish: Göthild Algotsdotter) (7th century), according to the Heimskringla, was the daughter of the Geatish king Algaut and the wife of Ingjald Ill, a semi-legendary king of Sweden. She was the mother of Olof Trätälja, the last Yngling ruler of Sweden and Åsa who married Gudröd, a legendary king of Skåne.

See also
Geatland
Geats

Sources

Ynglinga saga

7th-century women
Geats
Legendary Norsemen